Ercole Chaia (c. 1850 – 1905) was an Italian spiritualist who became particularly well known for working as manager of the medium Eusapia Palladino. He was responsible for convincing the reputed scientist Cesare Lombroso to attend Palladino's séances, as well as for organising her séance tours in several European countries.

References

1905 deaths
Italian occultists
Italian spiritualists
Year of birth uncertain